Hollis Wong-Wear, known mononymously as Hollis, is an American singer-songwriter and  creative producer. She is best known for featuring on "White Walls", a song by Macklemore and Ryan Lewis, which also featured Schoolboy Q. Hollis is also a spoken-word artist. Her major debut was on Macklemore & Ryan Lewis' debut album, The Heist. This was followed by the single "White Walls" in which she did the vocals for Macklemore and Ryan Lewis. This song peaked at number 15 on the Billboard Hot 100 chart.

Hollis was nominated for the 2014 Grammy Awards for songwriting and vocals on Macklemore & Ryan Lewis's album, The Heist.

Wong-Wear is the lead singer for Seattle-based R&B trio The Flavr Blue. Alongside her work with the band, Wong-Wear releases music under her first name. She released an extended play Half-Life in 2020 and is expected to release a debut record titled Subliminal, which has been preceded by multiple singles. She is currently signed to AntiFragile Music.

Discography

Albums

Extended plays

Singles

As lead artist

As featured artist

References

External links

American people of Chinese descent
American women singer-songwriters
People from Petaluma, California
Living people
Year of birth missing (living people)
21st-century American women singers
21st-century American singers
Singer-songwriters from California